Platinum is a color that is the metallic tint of pale grayish-white resembling the metal platinum.

The first recorded use of platinum as a color name in English was in 1918.

Platinum in human culture
Awards
 A platinum award is not as prestigious as a  diamond award, but it is more prestigious than a gold, silver, or bronze award. 

Credit cards

 A platinum credit card has a higher credit limit and a lower interest rate than a regular credit card; it is only available to someone with a good credit rating.

Literature
 In Isaac Asimov's Galactic Empire as depicted in his Foundation series, the monetary unit of the Galactic Empire, the galactic credit, is solidly backed because it is convertible to pure platinum—the Galactic Empire is on the platinum standard.

Marriage
 A married couple's 70th wedding anniversary is called their platinum anniversary.  The 70th anniversary of any important event can be referred to as a platinum jubilee, although this term is seldom used. 

Music
  a platinum album is an album whose sales figures have reached a certain amount. This threshold differs from market to market—in the United States, a platinum album is one that has sold at least 1,000,000 copies.

References

Shades of gray
Shades of white
Platinum